Chiodecton leprarioides is a species of lichen in the family Roccellaceae. Found in Réunion, it was described as a new species in 2021 by lichenologists Klaus Kalb and André Aptroot. Here it was found growing on tree bark in a secondary scrub forest. The specific epithet leprarioides refers to the farinose (mealy) soredia that cover the lichen thallus.

References

Roccellaceae
Lichen species
Lichens described in 2021
Lichens of Réunion
Taxa named by André Aptroot
Taxa named by Klaus Kalb